The Jammu & Kashmir National Conference (JKNC) is a regional political party in the Indian union territories of Jammu and Kashmir and Ladakh. Founded as the All Jammu and Kashmir Muslim Conference by Sheikh Abdullah and Chaudhry Ghulam Abbas in 1932 in the princely state of Jammu and Kashmir, the organisation renamed itself to "National Conference" in 1939 in order to represent all the people of the state.  It supported the accession of the princely state to India in 1947. Prior to that, in 1941, a group led by Ghulam Abbas broke off from the National Conference and revived the old Muslim Conference. The revived Muslim Conference supported the accession of the princely state to Pakistan and led the movement for Azad Kashmir.

Since 1947, the National Conference was in power in Jammu and Kashmir in one form or another till 2002, and again between 2009 and 2015. It implemented land reforms in the state, ensured the state's autonomy under the Article 370 of the Indian Constitution, and formulated a separate Constitution of Jammu and Kashmir in 1957. Sheikh Abdullah's son Farooq Abdullah (1981–2002, 2009–present) and grandson Omar Abdullah (2002–2009) have led the party after Sheikh Abdullah's death. The party is a member of the People's Alliance for Gupkar Declaration electoral alliance.

History

The pre-independence period
In October 1932, Sheikh Abdullah founded the All Jammu and Kashmir Muslim Conference in collaboration with Mirwaiz Yusuf Shah and Chaudhry Ghulam Abbas. On 11 June 1939 it was renamed as the All Jammu and Kashmir National Conference. This prompted a section of the leadership to break away and re-establish the Muslim Conference, with links to the All-India Muslim League. The National Conference was affiliated to the All India States Peoples Conference. Sheikh Abdullah was elected its president in 1947. In 1946, the National Conference launched an intensive agitation against the state government. It was directed against the Maharaja of Jammu and Kashmir, Hari Singh. The slogan of the agitation was "Quit Kashmir".

The post-independence period
In the elections held in September 1951, National Conference won all 75 seats of the Constituent assembly of Jammu and Kashmir. Sheikh Abdullah remained prime minister until his dismissal in August 1953 on the grounds of conspiracy against the state of India. Bakshi Ghulam Mohammad became prime minister of the state, and Sheikh Abdullah was arrested on 9 August 1953.

In 1965 the National Conference merged with the Indian National Congress (INC) and became the Jammu and Kashmir branch of the Indian National Congress. Sheikh Abdullah was again arrested in 1965 until 1968 for conspiracy against the state. Sheikh Abdullah's splinter Plebiscite Front faction later appropriated the name of the original party when Abdullah was allowed to return to power in February 1975 after striking a deal with the central government. In 1977, the National Conference he led won the state assembly elections, and Sheikh Abdullah became chief minister. His son Farooq Abdullah succeeded him as the chief minister on his death on 8 September 1982. In June 1983 elections, the JKNC, led by Farooq Abdullah, again won a comfortable majority.

In July 1984 Farooq's brother-in-law Ghulam Mohammad Shah split the party. Acting on the behest of the central government, the Governor dismissed Farooq as chief minister and replaced him with Ghulam Mohammad Shah. His government was dismissed in March 1986 and Presidential rule was imposed. In the contested state assembly elections of 1987, the JKNC formed an alliance with the INC, and was declared to have won a majority. Farooq Abdullah again became chief minister and on Abdullah's watch an insurgency against the State government and India began. Abdullah was dismissed again in 1990 by the Union Government and Presidential rule was imposed in the state. In 1991 the state elections were cancelled due to a revolt by the people.

1996 onwards
In Jammu and Kashmir state assembly elections in 1996, the JKNC led by Abdullah was awarded the election yet again winning 57 seats out of a total 87. This election like its predecessors has been deemed to be rigged and Abdullah stepped down in 2000. His son, Omar Abdullah then took up the reins of power in the state. But in 2002 state assembly elections, the JKNC won only 28 seats, with the Jammu and Kashmir People's Democratic Party (PDP) emerging in the Kashmir Valley as a contender for power. In the December 2008 state assembly elections, no single party was able to get the majority. The JKNC led by Farooq's son Omar Abdullah emerged as a single largest party, winning 28 seats. After the elections, on 30 December 2008 the JKNC formed an alliance with the INC which had won 17 seats. Omar Abdullah became the Chief Minister of this coalition government on 5 January 2009.

JKNC and INC contested 2009 general election in alliance. INC won all the two seats of Jammu region but lost Ladakh seat to NC rebel who contested as an independent candidate. NC won all the three seats of the Kashmir Valley in 2009.

During this period the JKNC has experienced increasing controversies over the Accession of Kashmir to India. Protests against the government in 2010 when approximately 100 protesters (one as young as 11) were killed as the result of live ammunition being fired by state paramilitary forces. A torture scandal was exposed by the WikiLeaks, revelations which were subsequently aired on Channel 4.

In the 2014 general election, the NC contested the election in an alliance with Indian National Congress but did not win a single seat. Out of six seats in the state, PDP and Bharatiya Janata Party (BJP) won three each.

During 2014 Jammu and Kashmir Legislative Assembly election, INC broke its alliance with JKNC. JKNC contested all the assembly seats but won only 15 seats, a decrease of 13 seats. PDP won 28 seats and became the largest party in the assembly followed by BJP winning 25 seats. Omar Abdullah resigned as a chief minister on 24 December 2014.

Prime Ministers of Jammu and Kashmir

Chief Ministers of the state of Jammu and Kashmir

Deputy Prime Minister and Chief Ministers of Jammu and Kashmir

See also
 Politics of Jammu and Kashmir 
 Jammu and Kashmir Peoples Democratic Party
 Jammu and Kashmir Apni Party
 Jammu and Kashmir Workers Party
 Ikkjutt Jammu
 Bharatiya Janata Party
 Indian National Congress
 Jammu and Kashmir People's Conference
 Democratic Azad Party

Notes

References

Bibliography

External links
 Jammu & Kashmir National Conference Party Website
Chowdhary, Rekha. "Electoral Politics in the Context of Separatism and Political Divergence: An Analysis of 2009 Parliamentary elections in Jammu & Kashmir". South Asia Multidisciplinary Academic Journal, 3, 2009.

 
State political parties in Jammu and Kashmir
Political parties established in 1939
Regionalist parties in India
1939 establishments in India